Wathey is a surname. Notable people with the surname include:

Andrew Wathey (born 1958), English academic
Claude Wathey (1926–1998), politician from the Caribbean island of Sint Maarten

See also
Wathen
Withey

English-language surnames